The 1924 Hamburg state election was held on 26 October 1924 to elect the 160 members of the Hamburg Parliament.

Results

References 

1924 elections in Germany
1924
October 1924 events in Europe